Three ships of the Soviet Navy have been named for the Bolshevik leaders Mikhail Ivanovich and Fedor Ivanovich Kalinin.
 Kalinin - an  formerly named Prymyslav
  - a 
 Kalinin - a  missile cruiser subsequently named Admiral Nakhimov

See also

One ship of the Baltic State Shipping Company was also named for Mikhail Kalinin
  - the lead ship of her class of passenger liner

Russian Navy ship names
Soviet Navy ship names